The 1954 Campeonato Nacional de Fútbol Profesional was first tier's 22nd season which Universidad Católica reached its second professional title. Highlighting, this was the first Primera División tournament with relegation system.

Format
The regular phase's first eight teams qualify to the Championship playoffs where they played seven games which were added to his first stage (regular phase) points, whilst the rest of the teams (from the 9th position to 14th position) disputed the relegation playoffs (five games with the same criteria) to determine the only one relegated team.

First stage

Scores

Standings

Championship stage

Scores

Standings

Relegation stage

Scores

Standings

Aggregate table

Topscorer

References

External links
 RSSSF Chile 1954

Primera División de Chile seasons
Chile
Prim